The Newaric languages are a proposed group of Sino-Tibetan languages. George van Driem (2003) and Mark Turin (2004) argue that Newar and Baram–Thangmi (consisting of the two closely related languages Baram and Thangmi) share many features with each other, and thus group with each other.

Comparative vocabulary
The following comparative 100-word Swadesh list of the Newaric languages Baram, Thami (Thangmi), and Newar, along with Chepang is from Kansakar, et al. (2011: 220-223).

References